Igreja do Menino Deus is a church in Portugal. It is classified as a National Monument. It was designed by the architect João Antunes.

See also
Catholicism in Portugal

References

Roman Catholic churches in Lisbon
National monuments in Lisbon District